Beatriz Santiago (born 28 October 1968 in Neully, France) is a Spanish long-distance runner.

She finished sixth in the 3000 metres at the 2002 IAAF World Cup and eighteenth in the long race at the 2003 World Cross Country Championships.

Personal bests
3000 metres - 8:59.22 min (2002)
5000 metres - 15:11.01 min (2001)
10,000 metres - 32:12.6 min (2000)
Half marathon - 1:13:24 hrs (2003)

External links

1968 births
Living people
Spanish female long-distance runners
Athletes (track and field) at the 2000 Summer Olympics
Olympic athletes of Spain
21st-century Spanish women